The environmental impact of Iron ore mining in all its phases  from excavation to beneficiation to transportation may have detrimental effects on air quality, water quality, and biological species.This is as a result of the release of large scale of iron ore tailings( solid wastes produced during the beneficiation process of iron ore concentrate) into the environment which are harmful to both animals and humans.

Introduction

Iron ore
Iron ore is rock containing enough iron content, and in sufficient volume and accessibility to mining and transportation to be able to be economically mined. Iron in ore iron is most commonly found in the form of magnetite (Fe3O4), hematite (Fe2O3), goethite (FeO(OH)), limonite (FeO(OH)·n(H2O)) or siderite (FeCO3). Hematite and magnetite are the most common types of Iron ore. Roughly 98% of iron ore on the global market is used in iron and steel production.

Another important mineral from which metallic iron is extracted is iron ore. Metal's high demand necessitates continuous mining and processing, which generates a large amount of solid and liquid waste. It generates a large amount of tailing from the beginning of extraction to the final stages, which contains various toxic metals such as Fe, Mn, Cu, Pb, Co, Cr, Ni, and Cd. It is estimated that nearly 32% of iron ore extracted ends up as tailings. Iron ore mining sites, as well as the wastewater tailings produced by them, contain high levels of dissolved iron and particulate suspended matter, which alter the water chemistry and metal bioavailability.

Mining and processing
In most cases, ores are mined and then subjected to various mechanical and chemical metallurgical processes in order to extract the metals and convert them to metallic (chemically uncombined) form. Metal recovery from ore entails three types of operations.

- The metal separation (ore dressing)

- Initial chemical treatment

- Metal reduction, usually followed by refining treatment.

The extraction of iron from its ore involves different stages in which the valuable minerals is first reduced from the gangue(wasteful materials), then the iron ore is calcined to a valuable metal. Most of the processing is done in a blast furnace, in which the blast furnace first reduces the iron ore to pig iron, before subsequent reduction to steel, cast iron, and wrought iron, depending on the type of furnace it is heated - cupola furnace, puddling furnace, OH furnace.

Common methods of extracting the iron ore consist of blasting, drilling, or general excavating, Most iron ore is produced from open-pit mines.

Blasting in iron ore is done by putting explosives materials which are drilled into holes and fired to break and loosen intact rock, so that ore and other material can be excavated and delivered to the processing plant, a stockpile, or a waste dump.

After the iron ore is out of the ground, it may be shipped to the iron and steel manufacturing plant. If the ore contains less than 60 percent iron, it is usually beneficiated to an iron-ore concentrate typically containing greater than 60 percent iron. This is done by separating the iron minerals from the valueless minerals, usually by magnetic, gravity, or froth floatation.

Issues

Air quality
The main sources of emissions during both the construction and operation phases include the products of combustion such as nitrous oxide, carbon dioxide, carbon monoxide, and sulfur dioxide and fugitive dust from the operation of equipment. The main sources of combustion-related emissions during both the construction and operation phases are related to diesel generators, fuel-oil boilers, and from on-site road traffic. Fugitive dust emissions can occur during land clearing, ground excavation, and from equipment traffic on site. Potential sources of fugitive dust during operation include ore loading and unloading, ore crushing, stockpile erosion, and dust from conveyor systems around the site. Fugitive dust emissions are proportional to the disturbed land area and the level of activity and vary substantially from day to day with varying meteorological conditions. The major effects of industrial air pollution on wildlife include direct mortality, weakening industrial-related injury and disease, and physiological and psychological stress

Gas and particulate emissions from historical smelting operations have been a source of concern for human health and environmental impacts at some sites. Modern smelters use processes that drastically reduce particulate and sulfur dioxide emissions, recognizing the importance of minimizing and mitigating this impact. Historically, sulfur dioxide was the most common source of concern because it reacts with atmospheric water vapor to form sulfuric acid, also known as "acid rain." The acidic conditions that develop in the soils where these emissions precipitate can harm existing vegetation and inhibit the growth of new vegetation. The environmental impact of historical smelting has left barren areas near smelting operations. Some areas that have been impacted for decades are now beginning to recover. Emissions from older metal smelters may have harmed human health in some cases. During the operation of lead-zinc smelters, for example, elevated levels of lead in blood have been measured in residents of some communities located near the smelters. Smelting operations are now combined with environmental controls to prevent potential environmental and health issues related to emissions.

Acid rock drainage
Acid is created when water and oxygen interact with sulphur bearing minerals and chemicals in rocks. Sulphuric acid is the most common chemical reaction that results from mining activities as the beneficiation process requires dissolving the minerals surrounding the ore, which releases metals and chemicals previously bound up in the rock into nearby streams, freshwater bodies, and the atmosphere.., . Acid may be generated under natural conditions prior to any disturbance, but mining activities typically magnify the amount of acid produced, thereby causing an inequality in the surrounding environment. This process is referred to as Acid Mine Drainage (AMD). Acid produced from AMD causes health hazards to many fish and aquatic organisms as well as land animals who drink from contaminated water sources. Many metals become mobile as water becomes more acidic and at high concentrations these metals become toxic to most life forms

Wetlands and flora

Some mines require the draining of nearby wetlands for the beneficiation process and the cooling of project machinery, which affects downstream water quality and water quantity, and flora and fauna. Wetlands include bogs, fens, marsh, swamps, and shallow water. Wetlands serve a number of functional purposes in the biosphere such as collecting and storing surface runoff, moderating stream flows, reducing natural flooding and erosion, cleaning and purifying water, recharging groundwater zones, and providing habitats for plants and animals,. Wetlands are being altered from their natural state to support alternative land uses such as agriculture, urbanization, industrial development, and recreation.

Megafauna
Some animals are more susceptible to change and degradation than others. Iron ore mines are projects with activities branching off into most aspects of ecology. Megafauna includes large mammals such as black bears, caribou, and wolves. This type of wildlife shows notable behavioural changes and are sensitive to noise levels caused by iron ore mining and infrastructure projects shortly before and immediately after young are born and during the rutting season,. These disturbance types increase the distances moved by the animals and may effectively decrease reproductive success, and starvation.

Environmental assessment
Infrastructure projects must be filed for submission, revision, and assessment under federal or regional legislation to ensure projects are carried out in a sustainable manner if it is thought to have a significant impact on the natural, social, or economic environment. Depending on the size, scope, and scale of particular projects, they can be assessed on a national or regional level. In most countries, larger plans are assessed under federal legislation such as CEAA 2012 and smaller projects are reviewed more locally, such as the |NL Environmental Protection Act 2010|. The purpose of environmental assessment is to protect the environment and quality of life of the people of the province by facilitating the wise management of the natural resources of the province. The environmental assessment process ensures that projects proceed in an environmentally acceptable manner. The size and scope iron ore projects makes it subject to environmental assessment in all levels of administrative legislation.

Water quality

Water is one of the major natural resources that is being polluted by iron ore mining operation. Pollution reduces with increasing distance away from the iron ore mining sites.

Metals are leached out, and acid water carries them downstream to the sea in sloppy regions. Water bodies are polluted during iron ore mining operations. When iron ore mining exposes metal-bearing ores rather than exposing ore bodies naturally through erosion, and when mined ores are placed on earth surfaces in mineral dressing processes, the risk of contamination increases.

Public Safety 
People are naturally drawn to old mining sites, but they can also be dangerous. They may have exposed or hidden entrances to underground workings, as well as old intriguing buildings. Ground sinking, also known as "subsidence," is another safety concern at some mine sites. Where underground workings have come close to the surface, the ground may gradually sink. Because an unexpected collapse can happen at any time, such areas are usually identified and should be avoided. When modern mines close, mine owners mitigate such hazards by sealing off mine workings, regrading and lowering the steep slopes of surface excavations, and salvaging or demolishing buildings and facilities. 

In some states, such as Colorado and Nevada, where old mining areas are common, current mine owners, government agencies, or other interested parties may undertake reclamation and safety mitigation projects to address hazards at these sites. These programs, at a minimum, identify hazards, place warning and no-trespassing signs, and fence off dangerous areas. As part of these efforts, entrances to old underground workings may be closed. Some abandoned mine workings have become important bat habitats. Mine openings can be closed to allow bats continued access and protection.

This practice is particularly beneficial to endangered bat species. Because many old mine sites may be dangerous, the casual visitor is advised to exercise caution and avoid entering them.

Physical disturbances 
The actual mine workings, such as open pits and waste rock disposal areas, cause the most physical disturbances at a mine site. When the mine is closed, mining facilities such as offices, shops, and mills that occupy a small portion of the disturbed area are usually salvaged or demolished. The main visual and aesthetic impacts of mining are open pits and waste rock disposal areas. Underground mining typically produces relatively small waste rock disposal areas ranging in size from a few acres to tens of acres (0.1 km2). These areas are typically found near the underground workings' openings. Because open pit mining disturbs larger areas than underground mining, the visual and physical impacts are greater. Because the amount of waste rock produced in open pit mines is typically two to three times the amount of ore produced, massive amounts of waste rock are removed from the pits and deposited in nearby areas.

Tailings impoundments, leach piles, and slag piles are examples of processing waste piles that vary in size but can be quite large. Some of the largest mill impoundments, such as those at open pit copper mines, can cover thousands of acres (tens of square kilometers) and be several hundred feet (about 100 meters) thick. Heap leach piles can range in size from a few hundred feet (about 100 m) to hundreds of acres (0.1 to 1 km2).

References

Environmental impact of mining
Iron mining